Thomas Robsahm (born 29 April 1964) is a Norwegian film producer and director. He is the son of actors Ugo Tognazzi and Margarete Robsahm, and is married to screenwriter and actress Silje Holtet. Robsahm has produced a large number of documentaries and short films. Films he has directed include the crime drama Svarte pantere (1992), and Myggen (1996), a documentary about Norwegian footballer Erik Mykland. His 1999 comedy S.O.S. was awarded the Amanda Award for best Norwegian film.

In 2009 he produced Angel, directed by Margreth Olin. He produced two films directed by Joachim Trier; Louder Than Bombs in 2015, and Thelma in 2017.

References

1964 births
Living people
Norwegian film directors
Norwegian film producers
Norwegian people of Italian descent